Eduardo Salim Braide (born January 12, 1976) is a Brazilian lawyer and politician. He was president of Caema (2005–2006) and secretary of Participatory Budgeting (2009–2010). Braide is federal deputy for Maranhão and was candidate for mayor of São Luís.

References 

Living people
1976 births
People from São Luís, Maranhão
21st-century Brazilian lawyers
Brazilian Socialist Party politicians
Party of National Mobilization politicians
Podemos (Brazil) politicians
Members of the Chamber of Deputies (Brazil) from Maranhão
Members of the Legislative Assembly of Maranhão